Sixmile Lake is a lake in Cass County, Minnesota, in the United States.

Sixmile Lake was named from its distance,  from the Indian agency on the Leech Lake Indian Reservation.

See also
List of lakes in Minnesota

References

Lakes of Minnesota
Lakes of Cass County, Minnesota